Robert Price "Stubby" Rowe (August 19, 1885 – September 21, 1948) was a Canadian professional ice hockey player who played 283 games in the Pacific Coast Hockey Association and four games in the National Hockey League.  He played for the Renfrew Millionaires, Victoria Aristocrats, Seattle Metropolitans, and Boston Bruins.

Rowe won the Stanley Cup in 1917 with the Seattle Metropolitans, the first time a team from the United States had won the coveted prize.

After his hockey career, Rowe worked with promoting midget auto racing in the Northwest United States.

Death 
He died in Portland, Oregon in 1948, aged 63.

Career statistics

References

External links

1885 births
1948 deaths
Boston Bruins players
Canadian ice hockey defencemen
Ice hockey people from Ontario
People from The Blue Mountains, Ontario
Portage Lakes Hockey Club players
Renfrew Hockey Club players
Portland Rosebuds players
Seattle Metropolitans players
Stanley Cup champions
Victoria Aristocrats players
Canadian emigrants to the United States
Canadian expatriate ice hockey players in the United States